Prone Lugo Asociación Deportiva is a futsal club based in Lugo, city of the province of Lugo in the autonomous community of Galicia.

The club was founded in 1984 and her stadium is Pavillón Municipal with capacity of 2,500 seaters.

The club has the sponsorship of Azkar transports.

Sponsors
Airtel Prone Lugo - (1997–98)
Café Candelas Lugo - (1998–02)
Azkar Lugo - (2002–2014)

Season to season

14 seasons in Primera División
4 seasons in Segunda División
2 seasons in Segunda División B

Current squad 2012/13

Trophies
UEFA Futsal Winner's Cup: 1
Winners: 2005-06

External links
Official website

 
Futsal clubs in Galicia (Spain)
Sport in Lugo
Futsal clubs established in 1984
1984 establishments in Spain